Peter McCullough may refer to:

Peter A. McCullough (born 1962), American cardiologist
Peter Eugene McCullough, American literary scholar
Peter R. McCullough (born 1964), American astronomer

See also
Peter McCullagh (born 1952), Irish statistician